Vince Girdhari Chhabria (born November 27, 1969) is a United States district judge of the United States District Court for the Northern District of California and formerly a Deputy City Attorney at the San Francisco City Attorney's Office.

Biography

Chhabria was born in 1969 in San Francisco, California to an Indian father from Mumbai and a French Canadian mother, born in Quebec.

He received a Bachelor of Arts degree in 1991 from the University of California, Santa Cruz. He received a Juris Doctor in 1998 from the University of California, Berkeley School of Law, graduating Order of the Coif. He served as a law clerk to Judge Charles R. Breyer of the United States District Court for the Northern District of California, from 1998 to 1999. He clerked for Judge James R. Browning of the United States Court of Appeals for the Ninth Circuit, from 1999 to 2000.

In 2001, he worked as an associate at the law firm of Keker & Van Nest, LLP. From 2001 to 2002, he clerked for Justice Stephen G. Breyer of the United States Supreme Court.

From 2002 to 2004, he worked as an associate at the law firm of Covington & Burling, LLP.

From 2005 to 2013, he served in the San Francisco City Attorney's Office, finally as Deputy City Attorney for Government Litigation and as the Co-Chief of Appellate Litigation.

Federal judicial service

On July 25, 2013, President Barack Obama nominated Chhabria to serve as a United States District Judge of the United States District Court for the Northern District of California, to the seat vacated by Judge Susan Illston, who took senior status on July 1, 2013. On January 16, 2014, his nomination was reported out of committee by a 13–5 vote. On March 5, 2014, the motion to invoke cloture on his nomination was agreed to by a 57–43 vote. His nomination was confirmed later that day by a 58–41 vote. He received his judicial commission on March 7, 2014.

One notable ruling by Chhabria was in the case of IMDb.com, Inc. v. Becerra, in which the website IMDb sued parties including California Attorney General Xavier Becerra and the Screen Actors Guild, seeking to counter a California law that barred IMDb from posting the birth dates of actors. Chhabria ruled that the California law was unconstitutional under the First Amendment to the United States Constitution.

On October 3, 2016, the U.S. Judicial Panel on Multidistrict Litigation appointed Chhabria to preside over the coordinated and consolidated pretrial proceedings for all product liability lawsuits filed against Monsanto in the federal court system, over failure to warn consumers and regulators that the glyphosate-based herbicide can cause non-Hodgkin's lymphoma.

In 2022, Chhabria presided over the sentencing of Jose Inez Garcia Zarate, a illegal alien who was acquitted of the 2015 shooting death of Kate Steinle in San Francisco but pleaded guilty to being a felon in possession of a firearm and a person illegally in the country in possession of a firearm.  Chhabria sentenced Zarate, who had been in Federal prison for seven years, to time served.  In sentencing Zarate, Chhabria warned, "“If you return to this country again and you are back in front of me, I will not spare you. Let this be your last warning: do not return to this country.”

See also 
 List of Asian American jurists
 List of law clerks of the Supreme Court of the United States (Seat 2)

References

External links

1969 births
Living people
American jurists of Indian descent
Judges of the United States District Court for the Northern District of California
Law clerks of the Supreme Court of the United States
Lawyers from San Francisco
People from Corte Madera, California
United States district court judges appointed by Barack Obama
UC Berkeley School of Law alumni
University of California, Santa Cruz alumni
Tamalpais High School alumni
21st-century American judges
People associated with Covington & Burling